The All-Union Conductors Competition was a competition among musical conductors in the Soviet Union from 1938 to 1988. It took place in Moscow for its first time in 1938 when a set of prizes were awarded by a jury chaired by Samuil Samosud and including Nikolai Myaskovsky, Heinrich Neuhaus, Alexander Goldenweiser, Aleksandr Gauk, Dmitri Kabalevsky amongst other relevant musicians. From 1966 to 1988, the competition took place quite regularly averaging about one event per five years.

Awarded list

1938: I edition
 Yevgeny Mravinsky (first prize)  
 Natan Rakhlin (second prize) 
 Alexander Melik-Pashayev (second prize)
 Konstantin Ivanov (third prize)
 Marcos Paverman (fourth prize)
 Kiril Kondrashin (diploma)

1966: II edition
 Yuri Temirkanov (first prize)
 Aleksandr Dmitriyev
 Fuat Mansurov
 Yuri Simonov
 Daniel Tyulin 
 Maxim Shostakovich

1971: III edition
 Alexander Lazarev
 Waldemar Nelson

1976: IV edition
 Valery Gergiev

1983: V edition
 Gintaras Rinkevičius

1988: VI edition
 Alexander Polianichko (first prize)
 Alexander Polishchuk (third prize)
 Rashid Skuratov (third prize)

References

Classical music awards
Soviet awards
Competitions in the Soviet Union